Chen Chien-an (born 16 June 1991) is a Taiwanese table tennis player. He won the 2008 World Junior Table Tennis Championships in singles.

In May 2013, in the 52nd World Table Tennis Championships held in Paris, France, Chen Chien-an and Chuang Chih-yuan defeated Hao Shuai and Ma Lin 9–11, 12–10, 11–6, 13–11, 9–11, 11–8 in the final, and won Men's Doubles title. Chuang and Chen became the first athletes in Taiwan to win any World Table Tennis Championships title.

Chen Chien-an is sponsored by the German table tennis brand TIBHAR.

Career

References

External links

Living people
1991 births
Taiwanese male table tennis players
Table tennis players at the 2010 Asian Games
Table tennis players at the 2014 Asian Games
Table tennis players at the 2018 Asian Games
Asian Games medalists in table tennis
Table tennis players at the 2016 Summer Olympics
Olympic table tennis players of Taiwan
Asian Games bronze medalists for Chinese Taipei
Medalists at the 2014 Asian Games
Medalists at the 2018 Asian Games
Universiade medalists in table tennis
People from Hsinchu County
World Table Tennis Championships medalists
Universiade silver medalists for Chinese Taipei
Universiade bronze medalists for Chinese Taipei
Ryukyu Asteeda players
Taiwanese expatriate sportspeople in Japan
Expatriate table tennis people in Japan
Medalists at the 2013 Summer Universiade
Medalists at the 2015 Summer Universiade
Medalists at the 2017 Summer Universiade
Table tennis players at the 2020 Summer Olympics
21st-century Taiwanese people